Journal hijacking refers to the brandjacking of a legitimate academic journal by a malicious third party. Typically the imposter journal sets up a fraud website for the purpose of offering scholars the opportunity to rapidly publish their research online for a fee. The term hijacked journal may refer to either  the fraud or the legitimate journal. The fraudulent journals are also known as "clone journals". Similar hijacking can occur with academic conferences.

Background
In 2012,  cyber criminals began hijacking print-only journals by registering a domain name and creating a fake website under the title of the legitimate journals.

The first journal to be hijacked was the Swiss journal Archives des Sciences. In 2012 and 2013, more than 20 academic journals were hijacked. In some cases, scammers find their victims in conference proceedings, extracting authors' emails from papers and sending them fake calls for papers.

There have also been instances of journal hijacking wherein hijackers  take over the journal's existing domain name after the journal publisher neglects to pay the domain name registration fees on time.

See also
:Category:Hijacked journals
Confidence trick
Passing off
Predatory open access publishing

References

Bibliography

External links
American librarian Jeffrey Beall's hijacked journal and authentic journal list
Hijacked Journal Checker 

Internet fraud
Academic publishing
 
Ethically disputed research practices
Ethically disputed business practices
Deception